Colin Bates (birth unknown) is a former professional rugby league footballer who played in the 1960s. He played at club level for Featherstone Rovers.

Club career
Colin Bates made his début for Featherstone Rovers on Wednesday 28 September 1960.

References

External links

Search for "Bates" at rugbyleagueproject.org

English rugby league players
Featherstone Rovers players
Place of birth missing
Place of death missing
Year of birth missing
Year of death missing